Wyszyny  is a village in the administrative district of Gmina Budzyń, within Chodzież County, Greater Poland Voivodeship, in west-central Poland.

The village has a population of 820.

It was the birthplace of the Wirydianna Fiszerowa, whose aunt Estera Raczyńska later owned the village and rebuilt a church there.

References

Wyszyny